Hypnotic is a 2023 American science fiction action thriller film co-written and directed by Robert Rodriguez. The film features an ensemble cast that includes Ben Affleck, Alice Braga, J. D. Pardo, Hala Finley, Dayo Okeniyi, Jeff Fahey, Jackie Earle Haley, and William Fichtner.

Hypnotic will be released theatrically in the United States on May 12, 2023, by Ketchup Entertainment.

Premise
A detective becomes entangled in a mystery involving his missing daughter and a secret government program, while investigating a string of impossible high-end heists.

Cast
 Ben Affleck as Daniel Rourke
 Alice Braga as Diana Cruz
 J. D. Pardo
 Hala Finley as Lev Dellrayne
 Dayo Okeniyi
 Jeff Fahey
 Jackie Earle Haley
 William Fichtner

Production
Robert Rodriguez had written the initial screenplay for Hypnotic back in 2002, calling it "one of my favorite stories". In November 2018, Rodriguez was confirmed to direct the film, with Max Borenstein rewriting the original script for Studio 8. In November 2019, it was reported that Studio 8 would co-produce with Solstice Studios, which had domestic distribution rights.

In November 2019, Ben Affleck was set to star in the film. In May 2021, Alice Braga was added to the cast, with filming set to begin on September 20 in Austin, Texas. In September 2021, Hala Finley was added to the cast. In October 2021, it was reported Dayo Okeniyi, William Fichtner and JD Pardo had joined the cast.

Principal photography began in Austin on September 27, 2021, and concluded on November 19 of the same year.

In April 2022, Rodriguez confirmed that, similar to his previous films, he and his family members collaborated on the project:

Release
Hypnotic is set to be released theatrically in the United States by Solstice Studios. In March 2023, it was reported that Ketchup Entertainment will serve as the U.S. distributor after Solstice Studios has been shut down in late 2022. A "work-in-progress" cut of the film was screened at South by Southwest on March 12, 2023. That same month, it's been announced that it will be released theatrically in the United States on May 12, 2023.

References

External links
 
 

Films directed by Robert Rodriguez